Sir Jabez Edward Johnson-Ferguson, 1st Baronet (27 November 1849 – 10 December 1929) was an English  businessman and Liberal politician.

Johnson-Ferguson was born Jabez Edward Johnson at Salford, Lancashire. He was educated at St John's College, Cambridge. He was a merchant of Lancashire living at Kenyon Hall, Culcheth near Warrington (Currently owned and used as Leigh Golf Club) and chairman of his company, which had several names including Messrs Jabez Johnson & Co and Jabez Johnson, Hodgkinson and Pearson, Ltd. He was also a director of Williams, Deacon & Manchester and Salford Bank Ltd. In 1881 he assumed by Royal licence the additional surname of Ferguson in 1881.

Johnson-Ferguson was elected as Member of Parliament for Loughborough in 1885. He was a radical Liberal. He lost the seat in 1886, but regained it in 1892, holding it until 1906. In 1891 he became a director of Bolckow Vaughan Co. Ltd, a mining company, and became its chairman and managing director in 1906 until his death. He became a baronet on 18 July 1906.

References

External links 
 

1849 births
1929 deaths
Baronets in the Baronetage of the United Kingdom
Liberal Party (UK) MPs for English constituencies
Members of the Parliament of the United Kingdom for Loughborough
UK MPs 1885–1886
UK MPs 1892–1895
UK MPs 1895–1900
Alumni of St John's College, Cambridge
People from Salford